Thomas Clifford (born 9 February 1999) is an English professional footballer who plays as a left back for Southend United.

Career
Clifford began his career at Sidcup-based youth team Foots Cray Lions, before moving to the academy at Tottenham Hotspur. In 2010, Clifford signed for Southend United. In the summer of 2018, Clifford signed his first professional contract with Southend, following a loan spell with Bishop's Stortford. On 26 December 2018, Clifford made his debut for Southend as a stoppage time substitute in a 1–0 defeat against Oxford United. During the 2019–20 season, Clifford was loaned to National League South club Concord Rangers, making twelve appearances, scoring once. At the end of the 2019–20 season, Clifford signed a one-year contract extension with Southend.

Career statistics

References

1999 births
Living people
Association football defenders
English footballers
English Football League players
Southern Football League players
Southend United F.C. players
Bishop's Stortford F.C. players
Concord Rangers F.C. players